Abish Ahmad (also Romanized as Abīsh Aḩmad; also known as Ābesh Aḩmad) is a city in Abish Ahmad District of Kaleybar County, East Azerbaijan province, Iran. At the 2006 census, its population was 2,329 in 526 households. The following census in 2011 counted 2,318 people in 591 households. The latest census in 2016 showed a population of 2,715 people in 789 households.

References 

Kaleybar County

Cities in East Azerbaijan Province

Populated places in East Azerbaijan Province

Populated places in Kaleybar County